Phaegorista zebra is a moth in the family Erebidae. It is found in Malawi.

References

Endemic fauna of Malawi
Moths described in 1897
Aganainae
Lepidoptera of Malawi
Moths of Africa